Shoeburyness Old Ranges or Shoebury Ranges is a 6.4 hectare Local Nature Reserve in Shoeburyness in Essex. It is part of the Foulness Site of Special Scientific Interest, and of the Gunners Park and Shoebury Ranges nature reserve, which is managed by the Essex Wildlife Trust.

The site has flora unique in the county, on a habitat of unimproved grassland over ancient sand dunes. There are areas of grasses and sedges, while rushes are found in damp hollows. Rabbits graze the grassland, and close cropped areas have many lichens.

There is no public access to the site, but it can be viewed from a footpath around the perimeter. The site was formerly part of MoD Shoeburyness.

Notes

References

Local Nature Reserves in Essex